Agaricus abruptibulbus is a species of mushroom in the genus Agaricus. It is commonly known as the abruptly-bulbous agaricus or the flat-bulb mushroom. First described by the mycologist Charles Horton Peck, this bulbous-stemmed edible species smells slightly of anise, and turns yellow when bruised or cut. The mushroom is medium-sized, with a white, yellow-staining cap on a slender stipe that has a wide, flat bulb on the base

Taxonomy and classification
The species was originally named as Agaricus abruptus by American mycologist Charles Horton Peck in 1900. In his 1904 Report of the State Botanist publication, he changed the name to Agaricus abruptibulbus. He explained that Elias Magnus Fries had earlier named a species in the subgenus Flammula, which he called Agaricus abruptus; the subgenus was later raised to the rank of genus, and the species was given the name Flammula abruptus. Under the transitioning  nomenclatural conventions of the time, it was unclear if Agaricus abruptus would remain available for use, so he changed the name.

Agaricus abruptibulbus belongs in the Arvenses clade of the genus Agaricus (along with species A. silvicola, A. arvensis, and formerly also A. semotus).

Some American authors consider this species to be synonymous with A. silvicola, while some in Europe have synonymized it with the similar species A. essettei. American mycologists Steve Trudell and Joseph Ammirati noted in a 2009 field guide: "The name A. abruptibulbus has been applied to forms with bulbous stipe bases, but variation in stipe shape is so great that the use of this name has been largely abandoned."

Description

After being scratched or bruised, the cap turns yellow. A large, white annular ring is present on the stipe. The gill attachment is free, and the color is initially grayish but turns brownish after the spores are developed. Specimens smell slightly of anise. The spore print is brown to purple-brown. Spores are elliptical in shape, and are 6–8 by 4–5 µm. The surface of the cap will stain yellow if a drop of dilute potassium hydroxide is applied.

Similar species
Agaricus silvicola is very similar in appearance and also grows in woodlands, but it may be distinguished by the lack of an abruptly bulbous base. Agaricus arvensis has a more robust stature, lacks the bulbous base, and grows in grassy open areas like meadows and fields. It has larger spores than A. abruptibulbus, typically 7.0–9.2 by 4.4–5.5 µm.

Cadmium bioaccumulation

Agaricus abruptibulbus is known to bioaccumulate the toxic element cadmium—in other words, it absorbs cadmium faster than it loses it—so specimens collected in the wild often have higher concentrations of this element than the soil in which they are found. Furthermore, when cultivated in the laboratory, the presence of cadmium in the culture medium stimulates growth up to 100% in the presence of 0.5 mg cadmium per liter of nutrient medium. It is believed that the cadmium-binding ability comes from a low molecular weight metal-binding protein named cadmium-mycophosphatin.

Distribution

The fungus has been reported in New York, Mississippi, Quebec, Canada,  and Germany.

See also

 List of Agaricus species

References

External links
 Roger's Mushrooms
 Mushroom Hobby
 Mushroom of Quebec French language, with several photographs

abruptibulbus
Edible fungi
Fungi described in 1900
Fungi of Europe
Fungi of North America
Taxa named by Charles Horton Peck